Hansa Shipping AS is an Estonian shipping concern founded in 1999 in Tallinn, Estonia. The company provides chartering, crew management and ship management services. Hansa Shipping operates a fleet of 37 dry cargo ships ranging in size from 3481 to 11048 DWT and deployed in the Baltic Sea, North Sea and the Mediterranean. 21 of the vessels are ice-classed and fly the EU flags.

References

Dry bulk shipping companies
Shipping companies of Estonia
Transport companies established in 1999
1999 establishments in Estonia